Actinotalea ferrariae is a Gram-positive bacterium that was isolated from iron mining power from the Hongshan Iron Mine of Daye City, Hubei Province, China.

References

External links
Type strain of Actinotalea ferrariae at BacDive -  the Bacterial Diversity Metadatabase

Micrococcales
Bacteria described in 2013